Thomas C. Watkins (1818–1903) was a Canadian writer. He wrote about the benefits of prohibition and the negative effects of alcohol on the person and on society. Watkins was an advocate for a "dry" Canada. He wrote that from a religious point of view alcohol and drinking was a sin. Buried in Hamilton Cemetery.

Written works
His writing includes:
 The Effects of Alcohol on the Human System
 Liquor and Labour: The Effects of the Liquor Traffic on the Working Classes
 The History of Intemperance 
 The Dietetics of Temperance
 Canada Must have Prohibition
 Alcohol as a Medicine

References

Canadian non-fiction writers
1818 births
1903 deaths